The Castle of Torre-Alháquime (Spanish: Castillo de Torre-Alháquime) is a castle located in Torre Alhaquime, Spain. It was declared Bien de Interés Cultural in 1993.

References 

Castles in Andalusia
Bien de Interés Cultural landmarks in the Province of Cádiz